The Dolmen de Viera or Dolmen de los Hermanos Viera is a dolmen—a type of single-chamber megalithic tomb—located in Antequera, province of Málaga, Andalusia, Spain. It was discovered between 1903 and 1905 by brothers Antonio and José Viera from Antequera, who also discovered El Romeral.

Description
Like the Dolmen de Menga, it is built with an orthostatic technique: large stones standing upright. It consists of a long corridor formed by twenty-seven stones, leading to a rectangular chamber. This is presumed to be a burial chamber, although only silica and bone tools and ceramics were discovered there.

The dolmen is covered by a mound or tumulus  in diameter. Like most Iberian tombs, it is oriented slightly south of east (96°), situated precisely so that at the summer solstices the sunlight at daybreak illuminates the burial chamber.

The left and right sides of the corridor appear to have consisted originally of sixteen slabs each; fourteen remain on the left and 15 on the right. Five larger slabs are intact in the roof, and there are fragments of two others; it would appear that three or four more have been entirely lost. The end of the corridor is a single large monolith with a square hole near its center. This and three other monoliths surround the chamber There is a notable difference between the stones of the sides and those of the roof: the former are much more carefully worked and fit perfectly into the recesses made in the stones of the entrance and the floor.

History
The Dolmen de Viera was built in the Copper Age, 3510-3020 BCE approx. It has had the status of a National monument since 1923.

Current status
The site is owned by the Council of Culture of the Andalusian Autonomous Government, who manage it as part of the Conjunto Arqueológico Dólmenes de Antequera. The dolmen was restored recently, and is open for visits by the public.

In 2016, the dolmens of Menga, Viera, and El Romeral were all inscribed as a UNESCO World Heritage Site under the name "Antequera Dolmens Site".

Gallery

See also

Antequera Dolmens Site
Dolmen of Menga
Dolmen de Soto
Tholos de El Romeral

Notes

Archaeological sites in Andalusia
Dolmens in Spain
Tourist attractions in Andalusia
World Heritage Sites in Spain
4th-millennium BC architecture
Bronze Age sites in Europe
Buildings and structures in Antequera